Novokulevo (Yañı Kül) is a rural locality (a selo) and the administrative centre of Novokulevsky Selsoviet, Nurimanovsky District, Bashkortostan, Russia. The population was 1,465 as of 2010. There are 28 streets.

Geography 
Novokulevo is located 14 km south of Krasnaya Gorka (the district's administrative centre) by road. Nimislyarovo is the nearest rural locality.

References 

Rural localities in Nurimanovsky District